The Golden Dawn are an American psychedelic rock band formed in Austin, Texas, United States, in 1966. The band released one album, titled Power Plant, before breaking up soon after the album's release in 1968. The 1966 release of the album was withheld by International Artists, until after The 13th Floor Elevators' album Easter Everywhere was released, even though Power Plant was recorded nearly a year earlier. As a result, the Power Plant 's reviews tagged it as a copycat record, unworthy of positive consideration. George Kinney remained a recluse figure in the music world for decades until a reemergence in 2001, when Power Plant became an iconic psychedelic recording.

Though the early break up of the original band was unfortunate, this was not the end of the band's influence. George Kinney, lead singer and lyric writer for the band, went on to renew the band with several incarnations up to the present day version resulting in the latest recording, Rebel Heart (2017).

Kinney has also published two full-length novels, The Bandit King and Brave New Texas.

Bobby Rector died in 2007, and Jimmy Bird in 2008. The band's original bassist, Bill Hallmark, died in February 2020. George Kinney died in July 2022. Lead guitarist, Tom Ramsey, resides in Austin, TX.

Band members
 Original:
 George Kinney – vocals, guitar
 Tom Ramsey – lead guitar
 Jimmy Bird – rhythm guitar
 Bill Hallmark – bass
 Bobby Rector – drums
 Since 2010 band members:
 George Kinney – vocals, guitar
 James Henry – lead guitar
 Michael Morris – drums
 Miranda Morris – background vocals, flute
 William von Reichbauer – bass, vocals

Discography
 Power Plant (1968)

References

1966 establishments in Texas
Musical groups from Austin, Texas
Musical groups established in 1966
Psychedelic rock music groups from Texas